Grizzly 2 may refer to:

 Grizzly II: Revenge, 1983 film
 Grizzly 2.0, an early 3D-printed rifle